R.U.S. Rebecquoise is an association football club from the municipality of Rebecq, Walloon Brabant, Belgium. It was founded in 1930 and currently plays in the Belgian Division 2, the fourth tier on Belgian football.

Current squad

References

External links
Belgium - RUS Rebecquoise - Results, fixtures, squad, statistics, photos, videos and news - Soccerway
R.U.S. Rebecquoise | Tous ensemble. On va le faire !

Football clubs in Belgium
Association football clubs established in 1930